Robert Gentleman may refer to:
 Robert Gentleman (water polo)
 Robert Gentleman (statistician)